Karukh District is situated in the northeastern part of Herat Province, Afghanistan. It borders Kushk District to the northwest, Kushki Kuhna District to the north and Badghis Province to the northeast. To the east is Obe District. To the south is Pashtun Zarghun District and Injil District is situated to the west. The population is 62,000 (year 2012). The district center is the town of Karukh.

Infrastructure
Only the road from province centre to the district centre has been asphalted and inside the district all the roads are in bad condition.  40% of the roads are open to traffic in all seasons of the year.

Notable people
Rangin Dadfar Spanta

References

External links
 Map of Settlements IMMAP, September 2011

Districts of Herat Province